The  is a  breed of dog from Japan, where it is a national monument. It is a rare dog even in its native land and is one of the six native Japanese dog breeds protected by the Nihon Ken Hozonkai.

Appearance

The Kai Ken is a medium-sized dog with a wedge shaped head and prick ears. Males are typically 18 to 22 inches at the shoulder, while the females are slightly smaller, 17 to 20 inches at the shoulder. The tail may be curled over the back, or carried in a sickle position. Limbs should be strong and hocks should be well developed reflecting the dogs’ history of mountain life. The coat is of harsh texture, medium length, and comes in various shades of brindle ("tiger" stripes). There are three main recognized shades of brindle: the Aka-tora (red), Chu-tora (middle), and Kuro-tora (black). Puppies are born a solid color, and their brindle markings develop as they age, sometimes taking as long as five years before fully showing.

Temperament

The Kai Ken is intelligent, agile, alert and brave. They are natural hunters and make good watch dogs, being reserved with strangers but loyal to their families. They are friendly, often good with children and are not usually aggressive towards other dogs. Many love to swim, and have been known to cross rivers and climb trees while chasing their prey.

History
The Kai Ken was split off from the Nihon Ken (Japanese Dog) landrace during the creation of the Nihon Ken Hozonkai (NIPPO) and named after Kai Province in Yamanashi Prefecture where the breed is said to have originated.

Being an agile and effortless climber, the Kai Ken was used to hunt in steep mountainous terrain in Yamanashi where's its primary quarry was the Japanese serow (Kamoshika), deer, wild boar, and occasionally bear.

After the creation of NIPPO in 1928, the Kai Ken was designated a national monument in Japan in 1933. In 1931 the Kai Ken Aigokai (KKA) was formed and became the primary Preservation Society for the breed in Japan and still is today.

In popular culture
 Many Kai Kens play important roles in the Yoshihiro Takahashi's series Ginga: Nagareboshi Gin and its sequel, Ginga Densetsu Weed, including the brothers Kurotora, Chūtora, and Akatora. In the sequel, Ginga Densetsu Weed, Kurotora's son, Kagetora, stars as an important character, with his less prominently featured brothers, Harutora and Nobutora, and cousins Dodo, Buru, Shōji, and Shigure.
 Another Yoshihiro Takahashi's manga, Kacchū no Senshi Gamu featured a villainous Kai Ken named Gama.
Chu, a Canine Warrior from the 2006 video game Ōkami, is also a Kai Ken.
Oswald "Ozzy" (played by Little Bear), a 600 year old magic dog in the movie The Amazing Wizard of Paws from 2015 by director Bryan Michael Stoller.
Rover, a large dog monster who becomes the main character's pet later in the series, in One-Punch Man is based on a Kai Ken.

See also
 Dogs portal
 List of dog breeds
 Japan Kennel Club

References

External links
The North American Kai Ken Association
Canada's Guide To Dogs, Kai Ken
About Kai Ken, Hozonkai (Japanese Dog Preservation Association) registered kennel Kai Dog Kennel- GINYASO

Dog breeds originating in Japan
FCI breeds
Spitz breeds
Rare dog breeds
Natural monuments of Japan